Derek Emmanuel Barbosa (born April 8, 1974), better known by his stage name Chino XL, is an American rapper, and actor. He has released four solo studio albums, in which his most recent – Ricanstruction: The Black Rosary – won the 2012 HHUG Album of the Year award 

Chino also forged a career in acting, signing with Hollywood talent manager Stacey Castro and subsequently appearing in several films and episodes of television. He was a series regular on Cinemax series Sex Chronicles and appeared in several guest star roles, including Comedy Central series Reno 911! and CBS series CSI: Miami. His feature film credits include a co-starring role opposite  Kate Hudson, Luke Wilson in director  Rob Reiner's Alex & Emma and Brandon Sonnier's directing debut, "The Beat", which premiered at the Sundance Film Festival.

He is the nephew of Bernie Worrell of music group Parliament/Funkadelic. Barbosa is also a member of Mensa.

Early life 
Chino XL was born in The Bronx, New York, but grew up in various parts of New Jersey. His father, who was of Puerto Rican descent, abandoned his African American mother before he was born. He was raised by his single mother.

Career 
After co-founding the duo Art of Origin, the emcee was signed at age 16 by music impresario Rick Rubin to Rubin's American Recordings label, which was once part of the Warner Bros. Records family. He released his debut album Here to Save You All in 1996, which was released to critical acclaim. The lead single "Kreep" which featured an interpolation of the Radiohead song "Creep" experienced major airplay by radio and MTV. Kreep charted on the Billboard Bubbling Under R&B Chart for a record 23 weeks, from July 1996 to January 1997.

Chino was released from his American Recordings contract when American Recordings switched distributors from Warner to Columbia in 1997. Warner Bros. Records then signed Chino in the fall of 1997. His sophomore album was due to be released during April 1999 but numerous delays prevented the album from being released. Although in early 2001 when the album was about to be released and its lead single "Let 'Em Live" featuring Kool G Rap was nearing early pressing stages Chino was dropped by Warner, as they folded their Black music department, supposedly due to the public legal battle with Prince. The album, titled I Told You So, was eventually released in 2001 by Metro Records.

In 2006, Chino released his long-awaited third album, Poison Pen. The now-iconic release featured appearances by Proof of D-12, Killah Priest and legendary hip hop duo The Beatnuts.

In 2007, Chino signed a contract with the Universal Latino label Machete Music.

In 2009 during a controversial interview with Allhiphop.com writer Han O'Connor, Chino revealed that his fifth studio album The RICANstruction was to be released soon. The album was released via his own joint venture CPR/Universal and featured Immortal Technique, Tech N9ne, and Bun B. The RICANstruction also featured a collaboration with Big Pun. The album featured production from DJ Khalil and Focus served as executive producer.

On August 19, a song titled "N.I.C.E." that was produced by Nick Wiz was released.

On September 25, 2012, the album Ricanstruction: The Black Rosary was released as a double disc through Immortal Technique's Viper Records. It won the 2012 HHUG Album of the Year award 

On June 15, 2013, Shanghai :30 Entertainment booked a show with Chino XL for him to play alongside local, on-the-rise hiphop artists.

In 2014, he formed a hip hop supergroup along with rappers Vakill, Copywrite, Tame One and producer Stu Bangas called Verse 48. They started working on an EP.

In 2015, he featured on UK singer/rapper RKZ's single 'They Don't Know Nothing'.

He is currently working on his new album, which will include a track with R.A. the Rugged Man.

In late 2019 Freemusicempire wrote that Chino XL is "The greatest name-checker in rap history" Dan-O wrote "Chino XL has a career full of jaw dropping name drops that don't benefit him at all. In 1996 he was clowning OJ Simpson, in 2012 he was making fun of Muhammed Ali's brain stem. If you are going to drop the name of someone important do 2 things for me A.) don't walk it back and apologize B) make it heinous. Do it out of an unparalleled fearlessness. Shake the world up so the people who feel safe don't anymore….and when the consequences come take them like a seasoned criminal takes a sentence. Or don't do it at all."

In December 2020, he released a joint extended play "Chino VS Balt" with Balt Getty, under Purplehaus Records.

Discography

Studio albums 
Here to Save You All (1996)
I Told You So (2001)
Poison Pen (2006)
Ricanstruction: The Black Rosary (2012)

Collaboration albums 
Something Sacred (with Playalitical) (2008)

Extended plays
Chino vs. Balt (with Balt Getty) (2020)

Singles 
 "No Slow Rollin'" with Art of Origin (1992)
 "Un-Rational" with Art of Origin (1993)
 "Purple Hands in the Air / Dark Night of the Bloodspiller" (1994)
 "Kreep" (1996)
 "No Complex / Waiting to Exhale" (1996)
 "Thousands / Freestyle Rhymes" (1996)
 "Deliver" (1996)
 "Rise / Jesus" (1997)
 "Let 'Em Live" (2000)
 "Last Laugh" (2001) Vs  (1998)
 "What You Got / Let 'Em Live" (2001)
 "Don't Run from Me / Warning" (2006)
 "Poison Pen" (2006)
 "Messiah" (2006)
 "Jump Back" (2007)
 "Lick Shots" with Immortal Technique, Crooked I (2008)
 "Chow Down" with Playalitical (2008)
 "N.I.C.E." (2012)
 "Arm Yourself" with DV Alias Khrist, Sick Jacken, Immortal Technique (2012)
 "Kings" with Big Pun (2012)
 "They Don't Know Nothing" with RKZ (2015)
 "March of the Imperial" with D.CrazE the Destroyer (2016)
 "Under the Bridge" with Rama Duke (2018)
 "Ascending To Mytikas" with Fuzzy Ed (2022)

Filmography 

Zane's Sex Chronicles (TV Series) as Syndicator 2010
El show (TV Series) as Professor xl 2008
"Death Pool 100" episode of CSI: Miami as Juan Carlos 2006
Gang Warz as Ro Conner 2004
Reno 911! (TV Series) as Hymning Perp #3 2004
The Young and the Restless (TV Series) as Buzz 2004
Playas Ball as Tico 2003
Alex & Emma as Tony / Flamenco Dancer #2 2003
Crime Partners as Finesse 2003
The Beat as Crazy 8 2002
Vatos as Vargas 2002
Barrio Wars as Osirus 2002

References

External links 
Chino XL on Discogs
Chino XL on ITunes

Chino XL: 'I'd S**t On Shakespeare by Han O'Connor (Allhiphop)

1974 births
African-American bodybuilders
African-American male rappers
American male rappers
Hispanic and Latino American rappers
American bodybuilders
American people of Puerto Rican descent
Living people
Rappers from New Jersey
Five percenters
Underground rappers
Mensans
21st-century American rappers
21st-century American male musicians
21st-century African-American musicians
20th-century African-American sportspeople